Giorgio Buttazzo from the Sant'Anna School of Advanced Studies, Pisa, Italy was named Fellow of the Institute of Electrical and Electronics Engineers (IEEE) in 2012 for contributions to dynamic scheduling algorithms in real-time systems.

References

Fellow Members of the IEEE
Living people
Year of birth missing (living people)
Place of birth missing (living people)
Academic staff of the Sant'Anna School of Advanced Studies